Zybiszów  is a village in the administrative district of Gmina Kąty Wrocławskie, within Wrocław County, Lower Silesian Voivodeship, in south-western Poland.

The village has a population of 190.

References

Villages in Wrocław County